The Great Indian Global Kitchen is an Indian television show, first shown in 2018,
 which features Indian dishes with a global twist and is hosted by celebrity chefs.

It is filmed in Mumbai, India, and produced by One Take Media Productions.

Chefs
Celebrity Chefs part of The Great Indian Global Kitchen:

 Chef Harpal Singh Sokhi
 Chef Vicky Ratnani
 Chef Ajay Chopra
 Chef Aditya Bal
 Chef Nilesh Limaye
 Chef Bhairav Singh

Presenters:

 Host Shamoly Khera 
 Host Reshmi Ghosh
 Host Gauri Jan Irani
 Host Sudeepta
Host Snehal Rai

References

Indian cooking television series